Chalaika  is a town in Dagana District in southwestern Bhutan.

References

External links
Satellite map at Maplandia.com

Populated places in Bhutan